Nicole Hause (born September 30, 1997) is a goofy-footed American skateboarder.

Skateboarding
Growing up in Stillwater, Minnesota as a young skater, Hause used to ride the metro to get to the “Girls Skate Free” night at 3rd Lair Skatepark in Golden Valley.

Hause began competing in 2013, making her debut at the 2016 Summer X Games. In 2017, Hause claimed the 2017 Vert Attack Woman's Champion title, placing first ahead of Kisa Nakamura & Allysha Le. In 2018, she repeated her first-place finish at Vert Attack, finishing ahead of Arianna Carmona & Allysha Le.

Hause is among the 16 members of the inaugural U.S.A Skateboarding National Team announced in March, 2019. Hause will compete to qualify for the 2020 Tokyo Olympic Games in the Women's Park division.

Hause was the grand marshal of the 2018 CenterPoint Energy Torchlight Parade.

Sponsors:
Real Skateboards, The House Boardshop, Bern Helmets, 187 Knee Pads

References

External links
Nicole Hause's website
Zen & the art of shredding: Nicole Hause didn’t teach me to kickflip, just everything else about life
Stillwater's Nicole Hause among wave of women energizing the X Games

1997 births
Living people
American skateboarders
Female skateboarders
People from Stillwater, Minnesota
X Games athletes
American sportswomen
21st-century American women